The Dockyard Derby Dames (DyDD) is a women's flat track roller derby league based in Tacoma, Washington. Founded in 2005, the league currently consists of three teams, and a mixed team which competes against teams from other leagues, and is a member of the Women's Flat Track Derby Association (WFTDA).

History
The league played its first public bout in May 2007.  By late 2009, it had around 60 skaters.  It has rented practice space at the Tacoma Armory.

The league was accepted into the Women's Flat Track Derby Association Apprentice Program in January 2010, and became a full member of the WFTDA in December. Dockyard Derby Dames did not skate in any WFTDA-sanctioned games between May 2015 and May 2017, and did not receive a year-end ranking for 2016.

WFTDA rankings

References

Sports in Tacoma, Washington
Roller derby leagues established in 2005
Roller derby leagues in Washington (state)
Women's Flat Track Derby Association Division 3
2005 establishments in Washington (state)